Depressaria ululana is a moth of the family Depressariidae. It is found in Spain, Portugal, France, Switzerland, Germany, Romania and North Macedonia.

The larvae feed on the flowers and unripe seeds of Bunium persicum. They live in a web just below the surface of the flowers. They are pale green, almost whitish, with a large black dorsal mark. Full-grown larvae descend to the ground and spin up amongst leaves. The larvae can be found from the end of June to the beginning of July.

References

External links
lepiforum.de

Moths described in 1866
Depressaria
Moths of Europe